Springville-Griffith Institute is a public high school located in Springville, Erie County, New York, U.S.A., and is the only high school operated by the Springville-Griffith Institute Central School District, which was originally established in 1830.

Footnotes

Schools in Erie County, New York
Public high schools in New York (state)
1830 establishments in New York (state)